Edward Needham (30 September 1872 – 26 October 1956) was an English-born Australian politician. Born in Lancashire, he was educated at Catholic schools before becoming a coal miner and shipyard worker. He migrated to Australia in 1900, becoming a boilermaker in Fremantle, Western Australia. He was a union and Labor Party official, and his sister married the future Labor Prime Minister of Australia, John Curtin.

In 1904, Needham was elected to the Western Australian Legislative Assembly as the Labor member for Fremantle, serving until 1905. In 1906, he was elected to the Australian Senate as a Labor Senator for Western Australia. He was the only one of Western Australia's six Labor senators to remain loyal to the party after the 1916 split over conscription, and he lost his seat in 1919 as a result. Re-elected in 1922, his second Senate term lasted until his defeat in 1928, taking effect in 1929. In 1933, he returned to the Legislative Assembly as the member for Perth, shifting to North Perth in 1950. He left the Assembly in 1953. Needham died in 1956. At the time of his death, he was the last surviving member of the 1907–1910 Senate.

References

 

Australian Labor Party members of the Parliament of Australia
Australian boilermakers
British coal miners
Members of the Australian Senate for Western Australia
Members of the Western Australian Legislative Assembly
1872 births
1956 deaths
English miners
Australian Labor Party members of the Parliament of Western Australia
English emigrants to Australia
20th-century Australian politicians